Adrian Walker is an American journalist. He is a metro columnist for The Boston Globe. His column appears in the Metro section of the Globe on Mondays and Fridays.

Career
A native of Miami, Walker, who is African-American, began his career at The Miami News, which folded in 1988. Walker began working as a Metro columnist in 1998. At The Boston Globe he is responsible for covering local and regional news along with society and culture.  
He contributed to The Boston Globe{{ Spotlight Team series “Boston. Racism. Image. Reality” that was a finalist for the Pulitzer Prize for Local Reporting in 2018. Prior to becoming a columnist, he covered local news as well as state and local politics. He was also the paper's deputy political editor from 1995 to 1997.
He was named an associate editor of the Globe in 2021.

References

External links
A collection of Adrian Walker's columns and other info

American columnists
The Boston Globe people
Journalists from Massachusetts
American male journalists
Year of birth missing (living people)
Living people
African-American journalists
Place of birth missing (living people)
21st-century African-American people